"World on Fire" is a song by American rock band Daughtry. Written by lead singer Chris Daughtry, it is the first single from their sixth studio album Dearly Beloved. It was released on August 13, 2020, via Dogtree Records as the album's lead single.

Composition
"World on Fire" is a song written by Chris Daughtry. The song is about how the world was, literally and figuratively, "on fire" due to the COVID-19 pandemic, the George Floyd protests and the bushfires during the 2019–20 Australian bushfire season during the year 2020.

Charts

Release history

References

2020 singles
2020 songs
Daughtry (band) songs
Songs written by Chris Daughtry
Songs about the COVID-19 pandemic